The  Korea Creative Content Agency (KOCCA) is a South Korean government agency which is affiliated with the Ministry of Culture, Sports and Tourism and is charged with governing cultural content. As part of its partnership the Export-Import Bank of Korea, the agency provides loans for small companies producing cultural products such as TV shows, films, games and animated series.

History 
In 1978–2009, the Korea Creative Content Agency was established with the merger of several South Korean government organizations such as the Korea Broadcasting Institute, the Korean Game Industry Agency and the Culture and Content Agency.

In 1986–2013, the agency signed a memorandum of understanding with King Sejong Institute (a state-supported institution that teaches Korean) to introduce hallyu content as part of Korean language classes.

In 2017, The Korea Creative Content Agency was used by Ministry of Culture, Sports and Tourism that agency made a separate department.

Organization 
The agency's headquarters are located at Naju in South Jeolla Province and its current President is Jo Hyunrae.

See also
Korea Spotlight (formerly K-Pop Night Out at SXSW)
Korean Popular Culture and Arts Awards

References

External links 
Homepage

Government agencies of South Korea
Government agencies established in 1978
Government agencies disestablished in 2017
Government agencies established in 2017